

Overtraining of AFL Athletes 

Overtraining is caused by too much high intensity training and/or too little regenerative time often combined with other training and non training stressors. At the present time, there is not a single diagnostic test that can be done to define overtraining. It is no secret among athletes that in order to improve, it requires hard work. However, training hard for long periods of time without significant rest causes a break down amongst the individual. Australian Rules Football is arguably the most taxing on an athlete as any other sport in the world. Elite AFL athletes have a unique physical makeup being strong, fast, agile, and aerobically well developed. The AFL has tight controls over the player lists of each club. Currently, apart from the recently added expansion clubs who have some additional players, each team can have a senior list of 38 to 40 players plus 4 to 7 rookie players, to a total of 44-47 players. Each team receives four match points per win and two points for a tie. After 23 rounds, the total number of points for a team determines where they finish on the ladder. After the regular season has commenced, the top eight sides compete in a finals series. The higher up you finish, the increased chance it is to make it into the AFL Grand Final. An AFL pre season typically begins in November, and carries through until the end of the preseason matches, which tallies up to be a four-month period. In this period of time, AFL athletes endure significant environmental challenges that can effect their performance and general wellbeing.

Causes of Overtraining 
There are multiple factors that can cause over-training. Sports conditioning and fitness training is stress, not mental stress, but adaptive body stress. If training loads for an AFL athlete are appropriate, then the athlete’s performance will rise but if the stress loads are above an acceptable level, a state of overtraining could present itself. These factors that contribute to over-training include too rapid an increase of loading after forced breaks (illness, injury), excess of competition with maximum demands and inappropriate increases in training hours. The most common causes of overtraining include quick increases in frequency, intensity, or duration of training sessions, or a combination without the necessary recovery.

Psychological Symptoms 

Mental health has an incredible amount of importance in the sporting landscape, with an increase of athletes coming out and admitting that they have a problem. Not only are the psychological symptoms a short term burden, they place an extreme long term risk on the mental health of an AFL footballer. AFL Players Association General Manager of Player Development, Brett Johnson, spoke on 3AW Adelaide about mental health in AFL football. He stated that Mental health is the number one health issue for 15- to 25-year-olds and AFL footballers aren’t immune to that. The psychological toll from the stress of training and games is enormous, and Johnson believes there are probably a lot of people who have different degrees of mental issues. Simon Hogan, an ex Geelong Cats footballer, retired after only 22 games due to depression, while current Geelong player Mitch Clark took time away from the game while he was at the Melbourne Demons for the similar reasons. Although those are extreme cases, there following includes common psychological symptoms that can be obtained from overtraining.   
 Increased irritability
 Obstinacy
 Tendency for hysteria
 Defiance
 Avoidance of contact with coach and colleges 
 Over sensitivity to criticism
 Anxiety
 Depression 
 Moodiness

Physical Symptoms 

A healthy body gives an athlete the greatest chance to achieve personal success. An AFL footballer heavily relies on their body, as they only get a maximum break of 10 weeks per year. Even then, each athlete has an off-season/Christmas break program that includes running and weights, so generally they would have no fitness requirements for approximately 2–3 weeks of the year. Some examples of physical symptoms are included below. When an AFL athlete resumes training, modifications to the athlete's workout may help prevent future reoccurrences of overtraining. The athlete's training should only include stress(es) similar to the metabolic pathways and motor skills needed for football. All cross training should be secondary during off season training and may even be eliminated during seasonal training. Jobe Watson, an accomplished midfielder for the Essendon Bombers, pleaded about the reasoning behind shortening the pre-season for an AFL player. He said that long pre-seasons are putting a huge mental and physical toll on the players. Some physical tolls of over training include the following. 
 Chronic soreness
 Fatigue
 Weight loss
 Loss of appetite
 Stomach/Intestinal upsets
 Sickness
 Infection

Solutions 

The AFL have been on the front foot in dealing with the high demands that an athlete has at their respective club. The off-season and Christmas breaks have been restructured to benefit both players and coaches. Strict guidelines have been put in place so that all 18 clubs must abide by. An extra week has been added to the off-season break, while the Christmas break has been extended by a few days depending on when each club wants their players back. This has been implemented to avoid the physical and mental burnout of both players and coaches. The AFLPA received strong feedback from the players in regard to their respective breaks, and fought hard to have an agreement with the AFL for an increase of holidays. Also, they are strongly pushing for two byes for each team in 2016.

 Increasing the off-season & Christmas break period
 AFLPA pushing for an extra bye for each team
 1 extra day off per week in the off season
 Monitoring of training/game loads with GPS
 Two study blocks during the season per week for study

References 

Australian rules football